The 1977 Wightman Cup was the 49th edition of the annual women's team tennis competition between the United States and Great Britain. It was held at the Oakland-Alameda County Coliseum in Oakland, California in the United States.

References

Wightman Cups by year
Wightman Cup, 1977
Wightman Cup
Wightman Cup
Wightman Cup 
Wightman Cup